"This Is the Way the World Ends" is the twelfth and final episode of the sixth season of the Showtime television series Dexter. It premiered on Showtime on December 18, 2011. In this episode, Dexter finally confronts the Doomsday Killer, Travis Marshall.

Plot
Dexter spends the night floating in the waters off Miami and is rescued by a passing migrant boat. Homicide is called to a double murder scene that turns out to be Travis' hideout. Inside, Dexter sees a depiction of the last tableau with his face painted in as the face of The Beast, and defaces the face with a hammer before anyone else can see it. Batista informs Quinn that he has put in for a transfer for Quinn due to his increasing irresponsibility, to which Quinn objects and storms out. Louis asks Masuka if he can have a full-time position at Metro once his internship ends. When Masuka asks him, "What about your video game?" Louis replies that it "just doesn't seem important any more" while looking past Masuka at Dexter. Debra tells Dexter he must return to the abandoned church to wrap up forensics. Travis sees that the police have found his hideout, so he retreats to Dexter's apartment. Travis hears Jamie in the home with Harrison. Realizing that Harrison is Dexter's son, Travis decides to use the boy as his sacrificial lamb in his final act to bring about the end of the world. Debra dispatches officers to skyscrapers in downtown Miami on a hunch that this is where the final tableau will be executed. Dexter attends Harrison's Noah's Ark play, after which Travis abducts Harrison. Dexter knows which skyscraper Travis has chosen, and arrives moments before Travis can sacrifice Harrison. Travis releases Harrison when Dexter feigns injecting himself with his tranquilizers. Dexter surprises Travis and beats him unconscious. Homicide arrives after the officer on guard fails to respond via radio and they find him dead with no sign of Travis. Debra rushes into her therapist's office and recounts that Dexter actually said, "I love you" to her, and decides she wants to tell him she is in love with him. Travis awakens on Dexter's table at the abandoned church and proclaims that he was doing God's work. Deb goes to the church unannounced and sees Dexter kill Travis. Dexter hears someone gasp, looks up and sees his sister, and says "Oh God."

Reception
The season six finale garnered 2.23 million viewers at 9 p.m. and 2.71 million viewers for the night, the series' best telecast of the year and highest-rated night.

The episode received mixed reviews from critics. Out of 15 reviews of the episode indexed by Metacritic, five were negative, six were mixed, and four were positive. Some critics did, however, point out the final scene of the episode for particular praise. IGN reviewer Matt Fowler claimed "The Season 6 finale just might give the show a new beginning", and praised the episode for the shocking final scene, awarding the episode an 8.5/10 (the second-highest score of the sixth season by IGN reviewers).

References

External links
 

2011 American television episodes
Dexter (TV series) episodes
Television episodes directed by John Dahl